Foundation is the fifth studio album from Hip Hop duo M.O.P. After being put in limbo with Roc-A-Fella Records without releasing any new material, the duo signed to G-Unit Records where they once again ended up without any releases beside mixtapes and street albums. Signing a deal with E1/Koch Records, Lil' Fame (Fizzy Womack) and Billy Danze finally release their long-awaited full-length LP on September 15. Production is handled by Fizzy Womack with additional contributions from DJ Premier, DR Period, Nottz, Statik Selektah, DJ Green Lantern, as well as a beat by little known producer Kil, whose contribution is credited to Fizzy Womack in the liner notes and in initial press releases.

The album was released to positive reviews from the press although it seems to have been a little rushed, as the aforementioned "Rude Bastards" got wrongly credited to Fizzy Womack, the final version of "What I Wanna B" features scratches and cuts by DJ Premier that didn't make the final cut and DJ Premier has also been quoted to say that he produced two more tracks for the album but didn't make the deadline due to M.O.P. touring to promote the album.

Track listing

Charts

References

2009 albums
M.O.P. albums
Albums produced by DJ Green Lantern
Albums produced by DJ Premier
Albums produced by Nottz
Albums produced by Statik Selektah